Taygetis servius is a species of butterfly of the family Nymphalidae. It is found in Brazil, where it has been recorded from Baixo Guandu in Espírito Santo and from Jitaúna in Bahia. It is probably also present in Minas Gerais.

References

Butterflies described in 1910
Euptychiina
Fauna of Brazil
Nymphalidae of South America